The 2022–23 Plymouth City Patriots season is the 2nd season of the franchise in the British Basketball League (BBL).

Players

Squad information

Depth chart

Transactions

In

|}

Out

|}

Pre-season and friendlies

Friendly matches

Competitions

BBL Championship

Standings

Matches

BBL Cup

First round

BBL Trophy

First round

Quarter-Finals

References

External links
 

Plymouth City Patriots season